The Women's 58 kilograms weightlifting event at the 2012 Summer Olympics in London, United Kingdom, took place at ExCeL London on 30 July.

Summary
Total score was the sum of the lifter's best result in each of the snatch and the clean and jerk, with three lifts allowed for each lift. In case of a tie, the lighter lifter won; if still tied, the lifter who took the fewest attempts to achieve the total score won. Lifters without a valid snatch score did not perform the clean and jerk.

On 13 July 2016, IOC announced that Yuliya Kalina of Ukraine was disqualified from the 2012 Summer Olympics and ordered to return the bronze medal from this event. Reanalysis of Kalina's samples from London 2012 resulted in a positive test for the prohibited substance dehydrochlormethyltestosterone (turinabol). The positions were adjusted accordingly.

Schedule
All times are British Summer Time (UTC+01:00)

Records

Results

 Yuliya Kalina of Ukraine originally finished third, but was disqualified after she tested positive for dehydrochlormethyltestosterone.
 Boyanka Kostova of Azerbaijan originally finished fifth, but was disqualified after she tested positive for dehydrochloromethyltestosterone and stanozolol.

New records

References 

Results 

Weightlifting at the 2012 Summer Olympics
Women's events at the 2012 Summer Olympics
Olymp